Johannes Wiese (7 March 1915 – 16 August 1991) was a German Luftwaffe pilot during World War II, a fighter ace credited with 133 enemy aircraft shot down in 480 combat missions. He claimed all of his victories over the Eastern Front, including over 50 Ilyushin Il-2 Shturmovik ground attack aircraft.

Born in Breslau, Wiese volunteered for military service in the Reichswehr of Nazi Germany in 1934. Initially serving in the Heer (Army), he transferred to the Luftwaffe (Air Force) in 1936. Following flight training, he was posted to Jagdgeschwader 52 (JG 52—52nd Fighter Wing) in June 1941 just prior to Operation Barbarossa, the invasion of the Soviet Union. He claimed his first aerial victory on 23 September 1941. On 26 June 1942, Wiese was appointed Staffelkapitän (squadron leader) of the 2. Staffel (2nd squadron) of JG 52 and received the Knight's Cross of the Iron Cross on 5 January 1943 following his 53rd aerial victory. On 11 May 1943, Wiese was tasked with the leadership of I. Gruppe (1st group) of JG 52 and was officially appointed its Gruppenkommandeur (group commander) on 13 November 1943. Following his 133rd aerial victory, he received the Knight's Cross of the Iron Cross with Oak Leaves on 2 March 1944.

In October 1944, Wiese was posted to the Geschwaderstab (headquarters unit) of Jagdgeschwader 77 (JG 77—77th Fighter Wing) in Defense of the Reich and on 7 November 1944, he was appointed its Geschwaderkommodore (wing commander). After the war in 1956 he joined the Bundeswehr and worked for the Military History Research Office. He retired on 10 November 1970 holding the rank of Oberstleutnant (Lieutenant Colonel). Wiese died on 16 August 1991 in Kirchzarten and was buried in Berlin-Nikolassee.

Early life and career
Wiese was born on 7 March 1915, in Breslau in the Kingdom of Prussia of the German Empire, present-day Wrocław in western Poland, the son of a minister. In 1934, Wiese volunteered for service in the Heer (German Army) and joined Infanterie-Regiment 6 (6th Infantry Regiment).

In 1936, Wiese transferred to the Luftwaffe as an Oberfähnrich (Officer candidate). There, he was trained as an aerial observer with the Heeresaufklärer (Army Reconnaissance). Wiese was promoted to Leutnant (second lieutenant) on 1 April 1937, and in September 1938 transferred to the Fliegerersatzabteilung 17 (17th Flier Replacement Unit) in Quedlinburg. He then volunteered for the Jagdwaffe (fighter force) and holding the rank of Oberleutnant (first lieutenant) he began fighter pilot training in October 1938.

World War II

Eastern Front
Wiese was posted to a front-line unit in June 1941, almost two years after the start of World War II. His unit was the Geschwaderstab (headquarters unit) of Jagdgeschwader 52 (JG 52—52nd Fighter Wing) where he served as an adjutant. On 22 June, the Geschwader crossed into Soviet airspace in support of Operation Barbarossa, the invasion of the Soviet Union, which opened the Eastern Front. He claimed his first aerial victory on 23 September 1941 and was awarded the Iron Cross 2nd Class on 27 September 1941 and the Front Flying Clasp of the Luftwaffe in Silver on 11 October 1941.

Wiese received the Iron Cross 1st Class on 1 May 1942. Following his 7th aerial victory he was appointed Staffelkapitän (squadron leader) of the 2. Staffel (2nd squadron) of JG 52 on 26 June 1942 and received the Front Flying Clasp of the Luftwaffe in Gold on 13 July 1942. On 29 September 1942, Wiese he claimed his 25th aerial victory. On 25 October 1942, he became an "ace-in-a-day" for the first time, claiming victories 29 to 33. Wiese was awarded the Honour Goblet of the Luftwaffe on 6 November 1942.

He became an "ace-in-a-day" again on 16 December 1942, which took his total to 43. On 25 December, Wiese claimed his 50th aerial victory. He was awarded the Knight's Cross of the Iron Cross on 5 January 1943 following his 53rd aerial victory. The presentation was made by General der Flieger (General of the Flyers) Günther Korten in Rossosh on the Eastern Front. Sources contradict themselves on the exact date of the presentation of the German Cross in Gold. According to Thomas, Patzwall and Scherzer, the presentation was made on 5 December 1942. According to Obermaier and Stockert, the presentation occurred on 8 February 1943.

Following a lengthy home leave, Wiese was tasked with the leadership of I. Gruppe (1st group) of JG 52 on 11 May 1943. The former commander, Major Helmut Bennemann had been severely injured by an incendiary bomb the day before. Initially, Wiese led both 2. Staffel and I. Gruppe in unison until on  1 July Oberleutnant Paul-Heinrich Dähne was given command of the Staffel. On 13 November 1943, he was officially appointed Gruppenkommandeur (group commander) of I. Gruppe and at the end of 1943, Wiese was promoted to Major (major). His most successful day was 5 July 1943, the first day of the Battle of Kursk, when he shot down twelve enemy aircraft in one mission, a double "ace-in-a-day" achievement. All 12 victories were over Ilyushin Il-2 Sturmovikground attack aircraft and took his total to 95 victories. On 17 July 1943, Wiese was credited with his 100th aerial victory. He was the 45th Luftwaffe pilot to achieve the century mark. In end July, Wiese had fallen sick and had to go to a Bad Wiessee for treatment. During his absence, Hauptmann Gerhard Barkhorn, the commander of 4. Staffel, temporarily led I. Gruppe from 4 to 30 August.

Following his 133rd aerial victory and his last, Wiese was awarded the Knight's Cross of the Iron Cross with Oak Leaves on 2 March 1944, the 418th officer or soldier of the Wehrmacht so honored. Wiese and fellow JG 52 pilots Erich Hartmann, Walter Krupinski, for the Oak Leaves presentation, and Gerhard Barkhorn, for the Swords to his Knight's Cross presentation, travelled on an overnight train from the Anhalter Bahnhof in Berlin to the Führerhauptquartier (Führer Headquarter) at the Berghof in Berchtesgaden for the award ceremony by Adolf Hitler on 4 April 1944. Also present at the award ceremony were Kurt Bühligen, Horst Ademeit, Reinhard Seiler, Hans-Joachim Jabs, Dr. Maximilian Otte, Bernhard Jope and Hansgeorg Bätcher from the bomber force, and the Flak officer Fritz Petersen, all destined to receive the Oak Leaves. On the train, all of them got drunk on cognac and champagne. Supporting each other and unable to stand, they arrived at Berchtesgaden. Major Nicolaus von Below, Hitler's Luftwaffe adjutant, was shocked. After some sobering up, they were still intoxicated. Hartmann took a German officer's hat from a stand and put it on, but it was too large. Von Below became upset, told Hartmann it was Hitler's and ordered him to put it back.

On 19 May 1944, Wiese was severely injured in combat. Following his convalescence, he was posted to the Verbandsführerschule (Training School for Unit Leaders) of the General der Jagdflieger (General of Fighters) at Königsberg in der Neumark, present-day Chojna in western Poland, on 11 June 1944. This ended his service on the Eastern Front.

Defense of the Reich and wing commander of JG 77
On 19 June 1944, Wiese participated in comparison test flights at the Luftwaffes main testing ground for new aircraft designs at Rechlin. On that day, the Luftwaffe tested and compared the Messerschmitt Bf 109 G-6, a Bf 109 G-6/AS, a Focke-Wulf Fw 190 A-8 against a P-47 Thunderbolt and a P-51 Mustang.

In October 1944, Wiese was posted to the Geschwaderstab of Jagdgeschwader 77 (JG 77—77th Fighter Wing) in Defense of the Reich on the Western Front. On 7 November 1944, he was appointed Geschwaderkommodore (wing commander) of JG 77, replacing Oberstleutnant (Lieutenant Colonel) Johannes Steinhoff, who was given command of Jagdgeschwader 7 "Nowotny" (JG 7—7th Fighter Wing), the first operational jet fighter wing in the world. Officially, command was handed over on 1 December 1944.

On 16 December 1944, the Wehrmacht launched its last major offensive campaign of the war. The operation codenamed Unternehmen Wacht am Rhein, or Battle of the Bulge (16 December 1944 – 25 January 1945), which failed to achieve its objectives, intended to split the British and American Allied line in half, so the Germans could then proceed to encircle and destroy four Allied armies, forcing the Western Allies to negotiate a peace treaty in the Axis Powers' favor.

Wiese led JG 77 in the opening phase of the offensive until 25 December 1944, when he was severely injured in a training exercise. Wiese and his wingman, Feldwebel (Sergeant) Hansch, took off at 11:20 a.m. on a training flight over German held territory. The plan was to meet up with I. Gruppe but the two failed to establish contact. In the resulting aerial combat, both Bf 109 G-14s were shot down, Hansch was killed in action while Wiese bailed out. He came down near Essen-Dellwig. His parachute only opened partially, resulting in a harsh landing, and loss of consciousness. Wiese was taken to a field hospital at Bottrop where he was diagnosed with a concussion and minor skull fracture. He spent the rest of the winter in hospital, and was replaced as commander by Major Siegfried Freytag. Their victors may have been Spitfires from the Royal Canadian Air Force (RCAF) No. 401 Squadron which claimed two Bf 109s from the Stab of JG 77 shot down over Duisburg that day. One of these victories was credited to Flying Officer John MacKay.

Wiese surrendered to U.S. forces at the end of the war and was handed over by the Americans to the Soviet Red Army on 6 September 1945. Wiese spent over four years in Soviet prisoner of war camps and was released on 28 November 1949. He was officially credited with 133 victories claimed in 480 combat missions. Additionally, he had 25 more unconfirmed claims. Among his claims were over 50 Il-2 Sturomoviks. Soviet fighter pilots therefore greatly respected Wiese, and referred to him as the "Lion of Kuban", a name he earned during combat over the Kuban bridgehead.

Later life
After the war in 1956, Wiese joined the Bundeswehr, the armed forces of the Federal Republic of Germany, and worked for the Military History Research Office. He retired on 10 November 1970 holding the rank of Oberstleutnant. Wiese died on 16 August 1991 in Kirchzarten and was buried in Berlin-Nikolassee.

Summary of career

Aerial victory claims
According to US historian David T. Zabecki, Wiese was credited with 133 aerial victories. Mathews and Foreman, authors of Luftwaffe Aces — Biographies and Victory Claims, researched the German Federal Archives and state that Wiese was credited with 118 aerial victories, plus 27 further unconfirmed claims. All of his victories were claimed on the Eastern Front.

Victory claims were logged to a map-reference (PQ = Planquadrat), for example "PQ 49423". These sectors were then subdivided into 36 smaller units to give a location area 3 × 4 km in size.

Awards
 Iron Cross (1939)
 2nd Class (27 September 1941)
 1st Class (1 May 1942)
 Front Flying Clasp of the Luftwaffe
 in Silver (11 October 1941)
 in Gold (13 July 1942)
 Honour Goblet of the Luftwaffe (Ehrenpokal der Luftwaffe) on 16 November 1942 as Hauptmann and Staffelkapitän
 German Cross in Gold on 5 December 1942 as Hauptmann in the I./Jagdgeschwader 52
 Knight's Cross of the Iron Cross with Oak Leaves
 Knight's Cross on 5 January 1943 as Hauptmann and Staffelkapitän of the 2./Jagdgeschwader 52
 418th Oak Leaves on 2 March 1944 as Major and Gruppenkommandeur of the I./Jagdgeschwader 52

Notes

References

Citations

Bibliography

 
 
 
 
 
 
 
 
 
 
 
 
 
 
 
 
 
 
 
 
 

1915 births
Military personnel from Wrocław
People from the Province of Silesia
German World War II flying aces
Shot-down aviators
German Air Force personnel
Recipients of the Gold German Cross
Recipients of the Knight's Cross of the Iron Cross with Oak Leaves
1991 deaths
German prisoners of war
German prisoners of war in World War II held by the Soviet Union